Esther Grande de Bentín, or simply Esther Grande, is a semi-professional Peruvian association football team based in Lurín, a suburb of the capital Lima.

Honours

Regional
Liga Mayor de Fútbol de Lima:
Winners (1): 1985
Runner-up (1): 1982

Liga Distrital de Surquillo:
Winners (2): 2013, 2014

Liga Distrital del Rímac:
Winners (1): 1981

See also
List of football clubs in Peru
Peruvian football league system

References
Esther Grande Bentín
Selección de Perú Sub 20, Esther Grande
Segunda División 1982-1990
Seleccion Sub 15
COPA FPF
Sub 17
Arquero Cuenca ex Esther Grande

Football clubs in Peru